The 1904 Saint Louis Blue and White football team was an American football team that represented Saint Louis University during the 1904 college football season. In their sixth and final season under head coach Martin J. Delaney, the Blue and White compiled an 10–0 record and were not scored upon all season. The team played nine of its ten games in its home city of St Louis, at three different venues: one game at Handlan's Park, four at Sportsman's Park, and four at the newly-opened World's Fair Stadium—now known as Francis Olympic Field—on the grounds of the Louisiana Purchase Exposition, also known as the St. Louis World's Fair. The stadium also hosted the 1904 Summer Olympics.

Schedule

References

Saint Louis
Saint Louis Billikens football seasons
College football undefeated seasons
Saint Louis Blue and White football